Exploit means to take advantage of something (a person, situation, etc.) for one's own end, especially unethically or unjustifiably.

Exploit can mean:

Exploitation of natural resources
Exploit (computer security)
Video game exploit
Exploitation of labour, Marxist and other sociological aspects

History
Exploits River, the longest river on the island of Newfoundland
Bay of Exploits, a bay of Newfoundland

Other
Exploit (video game), a browser video game by Gregory Weir
Exploit, episode of documentary Dark Net (TV series) 2016

See also
 The Exploited, a Scottish punk band
 Overexploitation
 Exploitation (disambiguation)